Bishop Andrew Raksam Marak is the current serving Roman Catholic bishop of the Roman Catholic Diocese of Tura, India.

Early life 
Marak was born on 5 February 1950 in Chimagre, Meghalaya, India.

Priesthood 
On 10 February 1982, Marak was ordained to the priesthood.

Episcopate 
Marak was appointed Coadjutor Bishop of the Roman Catholic Diocese of Tura on 3 June 2004 and ordained a bishop on 3 October 2004 by Archbishop Pedro López Quintana.

He succeeded as bishop of the Roman Catholic Diocese of Tura on 21 April 2007.

References

External links 

1950 births
21st-century Roman Catholic bishops in India
Living people
Bishops appointed by Pope Benedict XVI